Abdullah Al-Shaye (born 1964) is a Saudi Arabian former cyclist. He competed in the individual road race event at the 1984 Summer Olympics.

References

1964 births
Living people
Saudi Arabian male cyclists
Olympic cyclists of Saudi Arabia
Cyclists at the 1984 Summer Olympics
Place of birth missing (living people)